U.S. Route 550 (US 550) is a spur of U.S. Highway 50 that runs from Bernalillo, New Mexico to Montrose, Colorado in the western United States. The section from Silverton to Ouray is frequently called the Million Dollar Highway.
It is one of the roads on the Trails of the Ancients Byway, one of the designated New Mexico Scenic Byways.

Route description

New Mexico 

U.S. 550 begins just north of Albuquerque at Bernalillo and passes through the towns of San Ysidro, Cuba, Bloomfield, and Aztec.  Except for sections passing through the above listed towns, U.S. 550 in New Mexico has been upgraded to four lanes, offering a high-speed (70 mph) connection for Farmington, New Mexico and Durango, Colorado to Albuquerque and Santa Fe.

Colorado 
Most of U.S. 550 in Colorado is two-lane mountainous highway. (The other route is US 491.) The route travels north through the San Juan Mountains.

It is part of the San Juan Skyway Scenic Byway. Between Durango and Silverton the Skyway loosely parallels the Durango and Silverton Narrow Gauge Railroad.

Though the entire stretch has been called the Million Dollar Highway, it is really the twelve miles (19 km) south of Ouray through the Uncompahgre Gorge to the summit of Red Mountain Pass which gains the highway its name. This stretch through the gorge is challenging and potentially hazardous to drive; it is characterized by steep cliffs, narrow lanes, and a lack of guardrails; the ascent of Red Mountain Pass is marked with a number of hairpin curves used to gain elevation, and again, narrow lanes for traffic—many cut directly into the sides of mountains. During this ascent, the remains of the Idarado Mine are visible. Travel north from Silverton to Ouray allows drivers to hug the inside of curves; travel south from Ouray to Silverton perches drivers on the vertiginous outside edge of the highway. Large RVs travel in both directions, which adds a degree of excitement (or danger) to people in cars. The road is kept open year-round. The snow season starts in October, and snow will often close the road in winter. Chains may be required to drive.

North of Durango, the highway passes by Trimble Springs, hot springs that have been open for visitors since the late 19th century.  The highway runs north along the Animas River, under the Hermosa Cliffs.  It enters the San Juan National Forest and goes past Haviland Lake and Electra Lake.  Drivers pass by Engineer Mountain and Twilight Peak before crossing Coal Bank Pass.  Next is Molas Pass, which offers a panoramic view of Molas Lake, the Animas River Gorge, and Snowdon Peak.  Northbound travelers then pass through the town of Silverton, elevation 9,320 feet (2841 m), surrounded by 13,000 foot (4000 m) peaks Sultan Mountain, Kendall Mountain, and Storm Peak.

The highway leaves Silverton and proceeds up Mineral Creek Valley before ascending to Red Mountain Pass.  The ruins of the Longfellow Mine are visible along the way. The highway then goes through a series of steep grades and hairpin turns before reaching Lookout Point, which offers a view of the town of Ouray.

This section of the route passes over three mountain passes:
 Coal Bank Pass, elevation .
 Molas Pass, elevation .
 Red Mountain Pass, elevation .

The origin of the name Million Dollar Highway is disputed.  There are several legends, though, including that it cost a million dollars a mile to build in the 1920s, and that its fill dirt contains a million dollars in gold ore.

U.S. 550 ends at the corner of Townsend Avenue and San Juan Avenue in Montrose, Colorado at the junction of its parent route U.S. Highway 50.

History 

The original portion of the Million Dollar Highway was a toll road built by Otto Mears in 1883 to connect
Ouray and Ironton.
Another toll road was built over Red Mountain Pass from Ironton to Silverton.
In the late 1880s Otto Mears turned to building railroads and built the Silverton Railroad north from
Silverton over Red Mountain Pass to reach the lucrative mining districts around
Red Mountain, terminating at Albany just eight miles (13 km) south of Ouray.
The remaining eight miles (13 km) were considered too difficult and steep for a railroad.
At one point a cog railroad was proposed, but it never made it beyond the planning stage.

In the early 1920s, the original toll road was rebuilt at considerable cost and became the present day US 550. The Million Dollar Highway was completed in 1924.
Today the entire route is part of the San Juan Skyway Scenic Byway.

US 550 was part of the original 1926 federal highway system. The original highway extended 110 miles (177 km) from Montrose, Colorado at U.S. Highway 50 to U.S. Highway 450 (now U.S. Highway 160) at Durango, Colorado. In 1934, Highway 550 was extended through Farmington to Shiprock, New Mexico. In 1989, the western end of US 550 was replaced with US 64 between Farmington and Shiprock. In 2000, US 550 was extended further south from Aztec to Bernalillo to replace the newly upgraded NM 44 and NM 544, at which time all of US 550 in New Mexico was four lanes.

In 2009 US 50 was re-routed onto the San Juan Avenue bypass to avoid downtown Montrose. As a result, U.S. 550 was extended approximately one mile northwest to intersect with the new U.S. 50 alignment.

Major intersections

Related routes
 U.S. Route 50
 U.S. Route 150
 U.S. Route 250
 U.S. Route 350
 U.S. Route 450
 U.S. Route 650

See also

 List of United States Numbered Highways
 Cascade Lodge

References

External links 

 Endpoints of U.S. Highway 550

50-5
5
50-5
Transportation in Sandoval County, New Mexico
Transportation in Rio Arriba County, New Mexico
Transportation in San Juan County, New Mexico
Transportation in La Plata County, Colorado
Transportation in San Juan County, Colorado
Transportation in Ouray County, Colorado
Transportation in Montrose County, Colorado
San Juan National Forest
50-5